The 1996 San Francisco Board of Supervisors elections occurred on November 5, 1996. Six of the eleven seats were contested. Four incumbents and two open seats and were up for election. All seats were elected at-large.

Municipal elections in California are officially non-partisan, though most candidates in San Francisco do receive funding and support from various political parties.


Results 
Each voter was allowed to cast at most six votes.

External links 
City and County of San Francisco Department of Elections

San Francisco Board of Supervisors
Board of Supervisors 1996
Elections Board of Supervisors
San Francisco Board of Supervisors
San Francisco Board of Supervisors election